Weisenbach is a municipality in the district of Rastatt in Baden-Württemberg in Germany.

Mayors
-1993 Gerhard Feißt
1993–2019: Toni Huber
since 2019: Daniel Retsch

References

Rastatt (district)